Burt Freeman Bacharach (May 12, 1928 – February 8, 2023) was an American composer, songwriter, record producer, and pianist who is widely regarded as one of the most important and influential figures of 20th-century popular music. Starting in the 1950s, he composed hundreds of pop songs, many in collaboration with lyricist Hal David. Bacharach's music is characterized by unusual chord progressions and time signature changes, influenced by his background in jazz, and uncommon selections of instruments for small orchestras. He arranged, conducted, and produced much of his recorded output.

Over 1,000 different artists have recorded Bacharach's songs. From 1961 to 1972, most of Bacharach and David's hits were written specifically for and performed by Dionne Warwick, but earlier associations (from 1957 to 1963) saw the composing duo work with Marty Robbins, Perry Como, Gene McDaniels, and Jerry Butler. Following the initial success of these collaborations, Bacharach wrote hits for singers such as Gene Pitney, Cilla Black, Dusty Springfield, Tom Jones, and B. J. Thomas.

Bacharach wrote seventy-three U.S. and fifty-two UK Top 40 hits. Those that topped the Billboard Hot 100 include "This Guy's in Love with You" (Herb Alpert, 1968), "Raindrops Keep Fallin' on My Head" (Thomas, 1969), "(They Long to Be) Close to You" (the Carpenters, 1970), "Arthur's Theme (Best That You Can Do)" (Christopher Cross, 1981), "That's What Friends Are For" (Warwick, 1986), and "On My Own" (Carole Bayer Sager, 1986). His accolades include six Grammy Awards, three Academy Awards, and one Emmy Award.

Bacharach is described by writer William Farina as "a composer whose venerable name can be linked with just about every other prominent musical artist of his era"; in later years, his songs were newly appropriated for the soundtracks of major feature films, by which time "tributes, compilations, and revivals were to be found everywhere". A significant figure in easy listening, he influenced later musical movements such as chamber pop and Shibuya-kei. In 2015, Rolling Stone ranked Bacharach and David at number 32 for their list of the 100 Greatest Songwriters of All Time. In 2012, the duo received the Library of Congress Gershwin Prize for Popular Song, the first time the honor has been given to a songwriting team.

Early life and education
Bacharach was born in Kansas City, Missouri, and grew up in Forest Hills, Queens, New York, graduating from Forest Hills High School in 1946. He was the son of Irma M. (née Freeman) and Mark Bertram "Bert" Bacharach, a well-known syndicated newspaper columnist. His mother was an amateur painter and songwriter and encouraged Bacharach to practice piano, drums and cello during his childhood. His family was Jewish, but he said that they did not practice or give much attention to their religion. "But the kids I knew were Catholic," he added. "I was Jewish, but I didn't want anybody to know about it."

Bacharach showed a keen interest in jazz as a teenager, disliking his classical piano lessons, and often used a fake ID to gain admission into 52nd Street nightclubs. He got to hear bebop musicians such as Dizzy Gillespie and Count Basie, whose style influenced his songwriting.

Bacharach studied music (Associate of Music, 1948) at McGill University in Montreal, under Helmut Blume, at the Mannes School of Music in New York City, and at the Music Academy of the West in Montecito, California. During this period he studied a range of music, including jazz harmony. This style became important to his songs, which are generally considered pop music. His composition teachers included Darius Milhaud, Henry Cowell, and Bohuslav Martinů. Bacharach cited Milhaud, under whose guidance he wrote a "Sonatina for Violin, Oboe and Piano", as his greatest influence.

Career

1950s
Bacharach was drafted into the United States Army in 1950 and served for two years. He was stationed in Germany and played piano in officers' clubs there, and at Fort Dix, and Governors Island. During this time, he arranged and played music for dance bands. 

Bacharach met the popular singer Vic Damone while they were both serving in the army in Germany. Following his discharge, Bacharach spent the next three years as a pianist and conductor for Damone, who recalled, "Burt was clearly bound to go out on his own. He was an exceptionally talented, classically trained pianist, with very clear ideas on the musicality of songs, how they should be played, and what they should sound like. I appreciated his musical gifts." He later worked in a similar capacity for various other singers, including Polly Bergen, Steve Lawrence, the Ames Brothers, and Paula Stewart (who became his first wife). When he was unable to find better jobs, Bacharach worked at resorts in the Catskill Mountains of New York, where he accompanied singers such as Joel Grey.

In 1956, at the age of 28, Bacharach's productivity increased when composer Peter Matz recommended him to Marlene Dietrich, who needed an arranger and conductor for her nightclub shows. He then became a part-time music director for Dietrich, the actress and singer who had been an international screen star in the 1930s. They toured worldwide off and on until the early 1960s. When they were not touring, he wrote songs. As a result of his collaboration with Dietrich, he gained his first major recognition as a conductor and arranger.

In her autobiography, Dietrich wrote that Bacharach particularly loved touring in Russia and Poland, because he thought very highly of the violinists performing there, and appreciated the public's reaction. According to Dietrich, he also liked Edinburgh and Paris, along with the Scandinavian countries, and "he also felt at home in Israel", she wrote, "where music was similarly much revered". In the early 1960s, after about five years with Dietrich, their working relationship ceased, with Bacharach telling Dietrich that he wanted to devote himself full-time to songwriting. She thought of her time with him as "seventh heaven ... As a man, he embodied everything a woman could wish for ... How many such men are there? For me he was the only one."

In 1957, Bacharach and lyricist Hal David met while at the Brill Building in New York City, and began their writing partnership. They received a career breakthrough when their song "The Story of My Life" was recorded by Marty Robbins, becoming a No. 1 hit on the Billboard Country Chart in 1957. Soon afterward, "Magic Moments" was recorded by Perry Como for RCA Records, and reached No. 4 on the Most Played by Disc Jockeys chart. These two songs were also the first singles by a songwriting duo to ever reach back-to-back No. 1 in the UK (The British chart-topping "The Story of My Life" version was sung by Michael Holliday).

1960s
Despite Bacharach's early success with Hal David, he spent several years in the early 1960s writing songs with other lyricists, primarily Bob Hilliard. Some of the most successful Bacharach-Hilliard songs include "Please Stay" (The Drifters, 1961), "Tower of Strength" (Gene McDaniels, 1961), "Any Day Now (My Wild Beautiful Bird)" (Chuck Jackson, 1962), and "Mexican Divorce" (The Drifters, 1962). In 1961, Bacharach was credited as arranger and producer, for the first time on both label and sleeve, for the song "Three Wheels on My Wagon", written jointly with Hilliard for Dick Van Dyke.

Bacharach and David formed a writing partnership in 1963. Bacharach's career received a boost when singer Jerry Butler asked to record "Make It Easy on Yourself" and also wanted him to direct the recording sessions. It became the first time Bacharach managed the entire recording process for one of his own songs.

In the early and mid-1960s, Bacharach wrote well over a hundred songs with David. In 1961 Bacharach discovered singer Dionne Warwick while she was a session accompanist. That year the two, along with Dionne's sister Dee Dee Warwick, released the single "Move It on the Backbeat" under the name Burt and the Backbeats. The lyrics for this Bacharach composition were provided by Hal David's brother Mack David. Dionne made her professional recording debut the following year with her first hit, "Don't Make Me Over".

Bacharach and David then wrote more songs to make use of Warwick's singing talents, which led to one of the most successful teams in popular music history. Over the next 20 years, Warwick's recordings of his songs sold over 12 million copies, with 38 singles making the charts and 22 in the Top 40. Among the hits were "Walk On By", "Anyone Who Had a Heart", "Alfie", "I Say a Little Prayer", "I'll Never Fall in Love Again", and "Do You Know the Way to San Jose". She has had more hits during her career than any other female vocalist, except Aretha Franklin.

Bacharach released his first solo album in 1965 on the Kapp Records label. Hit Maker!: Burt Bacharach Plays the Burt Bacharach Hits was largely ignored in the U.S. but rose to No. 3 on the UK album charts, where his version of "Trains and Boats and Planes" had become a top five single. In 1967, he signed with A&M Records both as an artist and a producer, recording several solo albums (all consisting in a mix of new material and rearrangements of his best-known songs) until 1978.

In 1968, jazz musician Stan Getz re-visited several songs by Bacharach and David for his own album What The World Needs Now: Stan Getz Plays Burt Bacharach and Hal David. Bacharach expressed delight and surprise for this choice, saying quote, "I've sometimes felt that my songs are restrictive for a jazz artist. I was excited when [Stan] Getz did a whole album of my music". His songs were also adapted by several other jazz artists of the time, such as Cal Tjader, Grant Green, and Wes Montgomery. The Bacharach/David composition "My Little Red Book", originally recorded by Manfred Mann for the film What's New Pussycat?, would eventually become a rock standard.

Bacharach composed and arranged the soundtrack of the 1967 film Casino Royale, which included "The Look of Love", performed by Dusty Springfield, and the title song, an instrumental Top 40 single for Herb Alpert and the Tijuana Brass. The resulting soundtrack album is widely considered to be one of the finest engineered vinyl recordings of all time, and is much sought after by audiophile collectors.

Bacharach and David also collaborated with Broadway producer David Merrick on the 1968 musical Promises, Promises, which yielded two hits, including the title tune and "I'll Never Fall in Love Again". Bacharach and David wrote the latter song when the producer realized the play urgently needed another before its opening the next evening. Bacharach, who had just been released from the hospital after contracting pneumonia, was still sick, but worked with David's lyrics to write the song which was performed for the show's opening. It was later recorded by Dionne Warwick and was on the charts for several weeks.

Also in 1968, the duo wrote the song "This Guy's in Love with You", which was interpreted by Herb Alpert, who was best known at the time as a fellow songwriter and a trumpet player as the leader of the Tijuana Brass; the song went on to reach the top spot on the U.S. Billboard Hot 100 pop singles chart later that year, becoming the first No. 1 hit for Alpert and his label, A&M Records.

The year 1969 marked, perhaps, the most successful Bacharach-David collaboration, the Oscar-winning "Raindrops Keep Fallin' on My Head", written for and prominently featured in the acclaimed film Butch Cassidy and the Sundance Kid. The two were also awarded a Grammy for Best Cast album of the year for Promises, Promises; the score was nominated for a Tony Award, as well.  
    
Bacharach and David's other Oscar nominations for Best Song in the latter half of the 1960s were for "The Look of Love", "What's New Pussycat?", and "Alfie".

1970s and 1980s

Throughout the late 1960s and early 1970s, Bacharach continued to write and produce for artists, compose for stage, TV, and film, and release his own albums. He enjoyed a great deal of visibility in the public spotlight, appearing frequently on TV and performing live in concert. He starred in two televised musical extravaganzas: An Evening with Burt Bacharach and Another Evening with Burt Bacharach, both broadcast nationally on NBC. Newsweek magazine gave him a lengthy cover story entitled "The Music Man 1970".

In 1971, Barbra Streisand appeared on the special Singer Presents Burt Bacharach, where they discussed their careers and favorite songs and performed songs together. The other guests on the television special were dancer Rudolph Nureyev and singer Tom Jones.

In 1973, Bacharach and David wrote the score for Lost Horizon, a musical version of the 1937 film. The remake was a critical and commercial disaster; a flurry of lawsuits resulted between the composer and the lyricist, as well as from Warwick. She reportedly felt abandoned when Bacharach and David refused to work together further.

Bacharach tried several solo projects, including the 1977 album Futures, but the projects failed to yield hits. He and David reunited briefly in 1975 to write and produce Stephanie Mills' second album, For The First Time, released for Motown.

By the early 1980s, Bacharach's marriage to Angie Dickinson had ended, but a new partnership with lyricist Carole Bayer Sager proved rewarding, both commercially and personally. The two married and collaborated on several major hits during the decade, including "Arthur's Theme (Best That You Can Do)" (Christopher Cross), co-written with Christopher Cross and Peter Allen, which won an Academy Award for Best Song; "Heartlight" (Neil Diamond); "Making Love" (Roberta Flack); and "On My Own" (Patti LaBelle with Michael McDonald).

Another of their hits, "That's What Friends Are For" in 1985, reunited Bacharach and Warwick. When asked about their coming together again, she explained:

Other artists continued to revive Bacharach's earlier hits in the 1980s and 1990s. Examples included Luther Vandross's recording of "A House Is Not a Home", Naked Eyes' 1983 pop hit version of "(There's) Always Something There to Remind Me", and Ronnie Milsap's 1982 country version of "Any Day Now". Bacharach continued a concert career, appearing at auditoriums throughout the world, often with large orchestras. He occasionally joined Warwick for sold-out concerts in Las Vegas, Los Angeles, and New York City, where they performed at the Rainbow Room in 1996.

1990s and beyond

In 1998, Bacharach co-wrote and recorded a Grammy-winning album with Elvis Costello, Painted from Memory, on which, according to several reviews of the time, the compositions began to take on the sound of his earlier work. The duo would later reunite for Costello's 2018 album, Look Now, working on several tracks together.

In 2003, he teamed with singer Ronald Isley to release the album Here I Am, which revisited a number of his 1960s compositions in Isley's signature R&B style. Bacharach's 2005 solo album At This Time was a departure from past works in that Bacharach penned his own lyrics, some of which dealt with political themes. Guest stars on the album included Elvis Costello, Rufus Wainwright, and hip-hop producer Dr. Dre.

In 2008, Bacharach opened the BBC Electric Proms at The Roundhouse in London, performing with the BBC Concert Orchestra accompanied by guest vocalists Adele, Beth Rowley, and Jamie Cullum. The concert was a retrospective look back at his six-decade career. In early 2009, Bacharach worked with Italian soul singer Karima Ammar and produced her debut single "Come In Ogni Ora".

Bacharach's autobiography, Anyone Who Had a Heart, was published in 2013.

In June 2015, Bacharach performed in the UK at the Glastonbury Festival, and a few weeks later appeared on stage at the Menier Chocolate Factory in Southwark, South London, to launch What's It All About? Bacharach Reimagined, a 90-minute live arrangement of his hits.

In 2016, Bacharach, at 88 years old, composed and arranged his first original score in 16 years for the film A Boy Called Po (along with composer Joseph Bauer). The score was released on September 1, 2017. The entire 30-minute score was recorded in just two days at Capitol Studios. The theme song, "Dancing with Your Shadow", was composed by Bacharach, with lyrics by Billy Mann, and performed by Sheryl Crow. After seeing the film, a true story about a child with autism, Bacharach decided he wanted to write a score for it, as well as a theme song, in tribute to his daughter Nikki—who had gone undiagnosed with Asperger syndrome, and who committed suicide because of depression at the age of 40. "It touched me very much", the composer said. "I had gone through this with Nikki. Sometimes you do things that make you feel. It's not about money or rewards."

In 2018, Bacharach released "Live to See Another Day", co-written with Rudy Pérez and featuring the Miami Symphony Orchestra; the song was dedicated to survivors of gun violence in schools, as the proceeds from the release went to the charity Sandy Hook Promise, a non-profit organization founded and led by several family members whose children had been killed in the 2012 Sandy Hook Elementary School shooting.

In July 2020, Bacharach collaborated with songwriter and multi-instrumentalist Daniel Tashian on the EP Blue Umbrella, Bacharach's first new material in 15 years. It earned Bacharach and Tashian a Grammy Award nomination for Best Traditional Pop Vocal Album at the 63rd Annual Grammy Awards.

In March 2023, a collection of Bacharach's collaborations with Elvis Costello was due to be released. Entitled The Songs of Bacharach and Costello, the collection was expected to include 16 tracks from the proposed stage musical Taken From Life.

Film and television
Throughout the 1960s and 1970s, Bacharach was featured in a dozen television musical and variety specials videotaped in the UK for ITC; several were nominated for Emmy Awards for direction (by Dwight Hemion). The guests included artists such as Joel Grey, Dusty Springfield, Dionne Warwick, and Barbra Streisand. Bacharach and David did the score for an original musical for ABC-TV titled On the Flip Side, broadcast on ABC Stage 67, starring Ricky Nelson as a faded pop star trying for a comeback.

In 1969, Harry Betts arranged Bacharach's instrumental composition "Nikki" (named for Bacharach's daughter) into a new theme for the ABC Movie of the Week, a television series that ran on the U.S. network until 1976.

During the 1970s, Bacharach and then-wife Angie Dickinson appeared in several television commercials for Martini & Rossi beverages, and Bacharach even penned a short jingle ("Say Yes") for the spots. He also occasionally appeared on television/variety shows such as The Merv Griffin Show, The Tonight Show Starring Johnny Carson, and others.

In the 1990s and 2000s Bacharach had cameo roles in Hollywood movies, including all three Austin Powers movies, inspired by his score for the 1967 James Bond parody film Casino Royale. Myers said the first film in the series, Austin Powers: International Man of Mystery (1997), was partially inspired by the song "The Look of Love". After hearing the song on the radio, Myers began reminiscing about the 1960s, which helped him conceive the film. Myers later said of Bacharach's appearance in the movie: “It was amazing working with Burt. His song "The Look of Love" was the inspiration for this film. It was like having Gershwin appear in your movie."

Bacharach appeared as a celebrity performer and guest vocal coach for contestants on the television show American Idol during its 2006 season, during which an entire episode was dedicated to his music. In 2008, Bacharach was featured in the BBC Electric Proms at The Roundhouse with the BBC Concert Orchestra. He performed similar shows the same year at the Walt Disney Concert Hall and with the Sydney Symphony.

Musical style

Bacharach's music is characterized by unusual chord progressions, influenced by jazz harmony, with striking syncopated rhythmic patterns, irregular phrasing, frequent modulation, and odd, changing meters. He arranged, conducted, and produced much of his recorded output. Though his style is sometimes called easy listening, he expressed apprehension regarding that label, as some of his frequent collaborators did. According to NJ.com contributor Mark Voger, "It may be easy on the ears, but it's anything but easy. The precise arrangements, the on-a-dime shifts in meter, and the mouthfuls of lyrics required to service all those notes have, over the years, proven challenging to singers and musicians." Bacharach's selection of instruments included flugelhorns, bossa nova sidesticks, breezy flutes, tack piano, molto fortissimo strings, and cooing female voices. According to editors of The Mojo Collection, it led to what became known as the "Bacharach Sound". Bacharach explained:

While he did not mind singing during live performances, he sought mostly to avoid it on records. When he did sing, he explains, "I [tried] to sing the songs not as a singer, but just interpreting it as a composer and interpreting a great lyric that Hal [David] wrote." When performing in front of live audiences, he often conducted while playing piano, as he did during a televised performance on The Hollywood Palace.

Personal life

Bacharach married four times. The first time was to Paula Stewart for five years (1953–1958). His second marriage, to actress Angie Dickinson, lasted 15 years (1965–1980). They had a daughter named Nikki Bacharach (born 1966), who had Asperger syndrome and suffocated herself with helium on January 4, 2007, after struggling for many years.

Bacharach's third marriage, to lyricist Carole Bayer Sager, spanned nine years (1982–1991). The duo collaborated on a number of musical pieces and adopted a son named Cristopher Elton Bacharach.

Bacharach married his fourth wife, Jane Hansen, in 1993. They had two children, a son named Oliver and a daughter named Raleigh. 

Bacharach once owned the Dover House restaurant, which was located across the street from Roosevelt Raceway in Westbury, New York. It was the site of a press conference in which the New York Islanders unveiled their name and logo and introduced Bill Torrey as their first general manager.

Bacharach died of natural causes at his home in Los Angeles, California on February 8, 2023, at the age of 94.

Awards and nominations

Honors

1972, Songwriters Hall of Fame.
1997, Grammy Trustees Award, with Hal David.
1997, subject of a PBS "Great Performances" biography, "Burt Bacharach: This is Now".
2000, People magazine named him one of the "Sexiest Men Alive", and one of the "50 Most Beautiful People" in 1999.
2001, Polar Music Prize, presented in Stockholm by His Majesty King Carl XVI Gustaf of Sweden.
2002, National Academy Of Recording Arts and Sciences (NARAS) New York Heroes Award.
2005, GQ Magazine Inspiration Award.
2006, George and Ira Gershwin Award for Musical Achievement from UCLA.
2006, Thornton Legacy Award, USC; they also created the Burt Bacharach Music Scholarship at the Thornton School to support outstanding young musicians.
2008, Grammy Lifetime Achievement Award.
2009, Bacharach received an honorary Doctorate of Music from Berklee College of Music. The award was presented to him during the Great American Songbook concert, which paid tribute to his music.
2012, Gershwin Prize for Popular Song, with Hal David, awarded by the Library of Congress.

Television and film appearances
An Evening with Marlene Dietrich
Austin Powers: International Man of Mystery
Austin Powers: The Spy Who Shagged Me
Austin Powers in Goldmember
Marlene Dietrich: Her Own Song
Nip/Tuck
The Nanny
Jake in Progress

Discography

Solo albums
Hit Maker!: Burt Bacharach Plays the Burt Bacharach Hits (1965)
Reach Out (1967) (US: Gold)
Make It Easy on Yourself (1969) (US: Gold)
Burt Bacharach (1971) (US: Gold)
Portrait in Music (1971)
Living Together (1973)
Portrait in Music Vol. II (1973)
Futures (1977)
At This Time (2005)

Collaboration projects

With Elvis Costello 

 Painted from Memory (1998)

With Ronald Isley 

 Isley Meets Bacharach: Here I Am (2003)

With Daniel Tashian 

 Blue Umbrella (2020)

Live albums 

 Burt Bacharach in Concert (1974)
 Woman (1979)
 One Amazing Night (1998)
 Marlene Dietrich with the Burt Bacharach Orchestra (2007)
Burt Bacharach: Live at the Sydney Opera House with the Sydney Symphony Orchestra (2008)

Soundtracks

Films 

 What's New Pussycat? (1965)
After the Fox (1966)
Casino Royale (1967)
Butch Cassidy and the Sundance Kid (1969) (US: Gold)
Lost Horizon (1973)
Arthur (1981)
Night Shift (1982)
Arthur 2: On the Rocks (1988)
Isn't She Great (2000)
A Boy Called Po (2016)

TV 

 On the Flip Side (1967)

Theatrical works 
Marlene Dietrich (1968): concert – music arranger and conductor
Promises, Promises (1968): musical – composer (Tony Nomination for Best Musical)
André DeShield's Haarlem Nocturne (1984): revue – featured songwriter
The Look of Love (2003): revue – composer
The Boy from Oz (2003): musical – additional composer
Some Lovers (2011) – composer with Steven Sater
My Best Friend's Wedding (2021) – composer with Hal David

Compilations 

Burt Bacharach's Greatest Hits (1973)
The Best of Burt Bacharach (1999)
The Look of Love: The Burt Bacharach Collection (2001)
Motown Salutes Bacharach (2002)
Blue Note Plays Burt Bacharach (2004)
The Definitive Burt Bacharach Songbook (2006)
Burt Bacharach & Friends Gold (2006)
Colour Collection (2007)
Magic Moments: The Definitive Burt Bacharach Collection (2008)
Anyone Who Had a Heart – The Art of the Songwriter (2013)
The Songs of Bacharach & Costello (2023)

Production credits

For Marlene Dietrich 
Live at the Café de Paris (1954)
Dietrich in Rio (1959)
Wiedersehen mit Marlene (1960)
Dietrich in London (1964)

For Neil Diamond 
Heartlight (1982)
Primitive (1984)
Headed for the Future (1986)

For Dionne Warwick 
Reservations for Two (1987)
Friends Can Be Lovers (1993)

For Carole Bayer Sager 
Sometimes Late at Night (1981)

For Roberta Flack 
I'm the One (1982)

For Patti LaBelle 
Winner in You (1986)

For Natalie Cole 
Everlasting (1987)

For Ray Parker Jr. 
After Dark (1987)

For Barbra Streisand 
Till I Loved You (1988)

For Aretha Franklin 
What You See Is What You Sweat (1991)

For Carly Simon 
Christmas Is Almost Here (2002)

For Ronan Keating 
When Ronan Met Burt (2011)

For Elvis Costello 
Look Now (2018)

Notes

References

Works cited

External links

Burt Bacharach On A&M Records
A database of recordings of Burt Bacharach's songs
Déconstruction in Music, Academic article about Burt Bacharach
 

 
1928 births
2023 deaths
20th-century American composers
20th-century American conductors (music)
20th-century American pianists
21st-century American composers
21st-century American conductors (music)
21st-century American pianists
A&M Records artists
American agnostics
American film score composers
American male conductors (music)
American male film score composers
American male pianists
American musical theatre composers
American people of German-Jewish descent
American racehorse owners and breeders
Best Original Music BAFTA Award winners
Best Original Music Score Academy Award winners
Best Original Song Academy Award-winning songwriters
Broadway composers and lyricists
Columbia Records artists
Forest Hills High School (New York) alumni
Gershwin Prize recipients
Golden Globe Award-winning musicians
Grammy Lifetime Achievement Award winners
Jewish agnostics
Jewish American film score composers
Jewish American songwriters
Kapp Records artists
Male musical theatre composers
Mannes School of Music alumni
McGill University School of Music alumni
Military personnel from Missouri
Music Academy of the West alumni
Musicians from Kansas City, Missouri
People from Brookville, New York
People from Kew Gardens, Queens
Pupils of Darius Milhaud
Primetime Emmy Award winners
Songwriters from Missouri
United States Army soldiers
Varèse Sarabande Records artists
Writers from Kansas City, Missouri